Douglas Ogada (born 11 November 1948) is a Ugandan boxer. He competed in the men's light flyweight event at the 1968 Summer Olympics. At the 1968 Summer Olympics, he lost to Jee Yong-ju of South Korea.

References

1948 births
Living people
Ugandan male boxers
Olympic boxers of Uganda
Boxers at the 1968 Summer Olympics
People from Busia District, Uganda
Light-flyweight boxers